Atlas of an Anxious Man is a 2012 book by the Austrian writer Christoph Ransmayr. It consists of 70 texts with impressions from different places in the world, each beginning with the words "I saw".

The book was published in English in 2016, translated by Simon Pare.

Reception

Critical response
Gisela von Wysocki of Die Zeit compared the way of writing, with no clear distinction between journalism and fiction, to works by V. S. Naipaul, Bruce Chatwin and Hubert Fichte. She wrote that Atlas of an Anxious Man is a challenging book to read, partially because of the quick changes of location, but also because of the "immaculately worked" and "completely humour free" linguistic style. Wysocki wrote: "A splendid accomplishment, but also a problematic seductive pact. Because not even masterpieces are protected from monotony."

Accolades
 2013: Brothers Grimm Prize of the City of Hanau
 2014: Fontane-Preis der Stadt Neuruppin
 2015: Prix Jean Monnet de Littérature Européenne
 2015: Prix du Meilleur Livre Étranger – Non-Fiction

References

External links
 English publicity page
 German publicity page 

2012 non-fiction books
Austrian books
German-language books
Travel books
Works by Christoph Ransmayr
German non-fiction books
S. Fischer Verlag books